The former State Union of Serbia and Montenegro (Federal Republic of Yugoslavia) was represented at the Olympic Games on six occasions between 1996 and 2006, when the union was dissolved and Montenegro and Serbia each declared full independence.

History 
Yugoslavia had been represented at every Summer Olympic Games from 1920–1988, and all but two Winter Olympic Games between 1924–1988.  Because of the breakup of Yugoslavia in 1991 and 1992, Olympic participation changed.  Newly independent Croatia and Slovenia sent their own delegations to the 1992 Winter Olympics, with Yugoslavia represented by athletes from Bosnia and Herzegovina, Macedonia, Montenegro and Serbia.  These would be the last Games for the Socialist Federal Republic of Yugoslavia.

The Federal Republic of Yugoslavia was established in April 1992, consisting of the Republic of Montenegro and the Republic of Serbia. However, United Nations Security Council Resolution 757 (adopted May 30, 1992) called upon states to: 
Despite this, the International Olympic Committee decided unanimously that athletes from Serbia and Montenegro (and also Macedonia) could compete in the 1992 Summer Olympics in Barcelona.  The conditions imposed were that the athletes would compete as Independent Olympic Participants (IOP), wear white clothing without distinctive signs, and use the Olympic Anthem and Olympic flag in victory ceremonies. The athletes could not participate at the opening and closing ceremonies of the games.
A team of 52 athletes competed in individual events, with three medals won in shooting. The restriction for individual athletes meant that the men's water polo team, the women's basketball team, and the men's and women's handball teams could not compete, despite having qualified for the Games.

The continued sanctions against FR Yugoslavia meant that no athletes could qualify to compete or even to compete under the Olympic flag at the 1994 Winter Olympics in Lillehammer.  The sanctions were lifted in time for the next Olympiad.

At the 1996 Summer Olympics in Atlanta, Georgia, the team was designated Yugoslavia, using the same IOC code (YUG) as the former Socialist Federal Republic of Yugoslavia in 1988 and previous Games.  despite the fact that FR Yugoslavia had not been recognized as the successor to SFRY.  The team of 68 athletes participated in 13 sports and won four medals.  In Sydney for the 2000 Summer Olympics, the Yugoslavia team participated with 111 athletes in 14 sports and won three medals.

In 2003, the Federal Republic of Yugoslavia reconstituted as the State Union of Serbia and Montenegro, and the nation was designated Serbia and Montenegro (SCG) for the first time at the 2004 Summer Olympics in Athens.  The team of 87 athletes competed in 14 sports and won two silver medals.

After the Montenegrin independence referendum in 2006, the state union was dissolved and each nation declared independence.  The Olympic Committee of Serbia succeeded the NOC for Serbia and Montenegro in June 2006, with approval of the Assembly of the Olympic Committee of Serbia and Montenegro. The newly formed Montenegrin Olympic Committee was recognized by the IOC in July 2007. At the 2008 Summer Olympics in Beijing, Serbia returned to the Olympics for the first time in 96 years under that name, while Montenegro made its debut as an independent nation.

Participation

Timeline of participation

Medal tables

Medals by Summer Games 
Medals won by the National Olympic Committee designated first with IOC code YUG then with SCG (upon the renaming of the nation, with no change in NOC territorial coverage):

Medals by Winter Games

Medals by sport

List of medalists 
This list includes all competitors who won Olympic medals for Serbia and Montenegro (SCG), including under its previous designation as Federal Republic of Yugoslavia (FRY).

Flagbearers
Flag bearers carry the national flag of their country at the opening ceremony of the Olympic Games.

See also
 List of flag bearers for Serbia and Montenegro at the Olympics
 Serbia and Montenegro at the Paralympics

References

External links